Chuck Kelley  may refer to:

 Chuck Kelley (actor), "Sarge" in Skid Marks (film)
 Chuck Kelley, consultant, computer architect and co-author of the book Rdb/VMS: Developing the Data Warehouse with Bill Inmon
 Chuck Kelley (music consultant and record producer), music consultant on Pulp Fiction
 Chuck Kelley (poker player), appeared in 2008 World Series of Poker Circuit and in World Poker Tour: Season 5
 Chuck Kelley (seminary president), see New Orleans Baptist Theological Seminary

See also
Charles Kelley
Charles Kelly (disambiguation)